Michael Lockman (born 29 August 1963) is a former Australian rules footballer who played with Richmond,  Collingwood and the Sydney Swans in the Victorian Football League (VFL).

Originally from Victorian Amateur Football Association (VAFA) club East Malvern, Lockman had two separate stints at Richmond. After playing three games for Richmond early in 1986, he was traded to Collingwood where he finished the season. He made the move north to Sydney in 1988 and appeared in the opening 11 rounds of the season but didn't feature in the second half of the year. In the 1989 pre season he nominated for the draft but was unable to attract a fourth VFL club.

Lockman went on to become a coach and was in charge of TFL Statewide League club Launceston in 1996 and 1997.

References

1963 births
Australian rules footballers from Victoria (Australia)
Richmond Football Club players
Collingwood Football Club players
Sydney Swans players
Launceston Football Club coaches
Living people